Jan Renders (born 11 February 1938) is a Dutch footballer. He played in five matches for the Netherlands national football team from 1959 to 1962.

References

External links
 

1938 births
Living people
Dutch footballers
Netherlands international footballers
Place of birth missing (living people)
Association footballers not categorized by position